The Colorado Rockies' 2000 season was the eighth for the Rockies. They competed in the National League West. Buddy Bell was their manager. They played home games at Coors Field. They finished with a record of 82-80, 4th in the NL West. Despite the team finishing 4th in their division and finishing with a mediocre record, the team batted excellently; the 2000 Rockies combined for a team batting average of .294, which was the integration era's highest mark since the 1950 Boston Red Sox batted .302. They led the league in hits; finished 2nd in on-base percentage (tied with the San Francisco Giants) and runs scored; and third in stolen bases (tied with the San Diego Padres).

Offseason
 October 30, 1999: Dante Bichette was traded by the Colorado Rockies with cash to the Cincinnati Reds for Stan Belinda and Jeffrey Hammonds.
 November 16, 1999: Darryl Kile was traded by the Colorado Rockies with Luther Hackman and Dave Veres to the St. Louis Cardinals for Manny Aybar, Brent Butler, Rich Croushore, and José Jiménez.
 November 17, 1999: Curt Leskanic was traded by the Colorado Rockies to the Milwaukee Brewers for Mike Myers.
 November 21, 1999: Julián Tavárez was selected off waivers by the Colorado Rockies from the San Francisco Giants.
 December 9, 1999: Tom Goodwin was signed as a free agent by the Colorado Rockies.
 December 13, 1999: Vinny Castilla was traded by the Colorado Rockies to the Tampa Bay Devil Rays for Rolando Arrojo and Aaron Ledesma.
 December 13, 1999: Jamey Wright was traded by the Colorado Rockies with Henry Blanco to the Milwaukee Brewers for Jeff Cirillo and Scott Karl.
 December 16, 1999: Brent Mayne was signed as a free agent by the Colorado Rockies.
 January 14, 2000: Bobby Jones was traded by the Colorado Rockies with Lariel González to the New York Mets for Masato Yoshii.
 March 31, 2000: Brian Hunter was signed as a free agent by the Colorado Rockies.

Regular season

Opening Day starters

Season standings

Record vs. opponents

Transactions

 April 7, 2000: Manny Aybar was traded by the Colorado Rockies to the Cincinnati Reds for Gabe White.
 June 5, 2000: Garrett Atkins was drafted by the Colorado Rockies in the 5th round of the 2000 amateur draft. Player signed June 22, 2000.
 June 5, 2000: Clint Barmes was drafted by the Colorado Rockies in the 10th round of the 2000 amateur draft. Player signed June 9, 2000.
 June 5, 2000: Brad Hawpe was drafted by the Colorado Rockies in the 11th round of the 2000 amateur draft. Player signed June 21, 2000.
 July 15, 2000: Todd Sears (minors) was traded by the Colorado Rockies to the Minnesota Twins for Butch Huskey and Todd Walker.
 July 27, 2000: Rolando Arrojo was traded by the Colorado Rockies with Rich Croushore and Mike Lansing to the Boston Red Sox for Jeff Frye, Brian Rose, John Wasdin, and Jeff Taglienti (minors).
 July 31, 2000: Todd Hollandsworth was traded by the Los Angeles Dodgers with Kevin Gibbs (minors) and Randey Dorame (minors) to the Colorado Rockies for Tom Goodwin and cash.

Major League debuts
 Batters:
 Bubba Carpenter (May 13)
 Juan Pierre (Aug 7)
 Elvis Peña (Sep 2)
 Pitchers:
 Craig House (Aug 6)

Roster

Player stats

Batting

Starters by position 
Note: Pos = Position; G = Games played; AB = At bats; H = Hits; Avg. = Batting average; HR = Home runs; RBI = Runs batted in: SB = Stolen bases

Other batters 
Note: G = Games played; AB = At bats; H = Hits; Avg. = Batting average; HR = Home runs; RBI = Runs batted in; SB = Stolen bases

Pitching

Starting pitchers 
Note: G = Games pitched; IP = Innings pitched; W = Wins; L = Losses; ERA = Earned run average; SO = Strikeouts

Relief pitchers 
Note: G = Games pitched; IP = Innings pitched; W = Wins; L = Losses; ERA = Earned run average; SO = Strikeouts; SV = Saves

Other pitchers 
Note: G = Games pitched; IP = Innings pitched; W = Wins; L = Losses; ERA = Earned run average; SO = Strikeouts; SV = Saves

Game log 

|-  style="text-align:center; background:#fbb;"
| 1 || April 3 || @ Braves || 2–0 || Maddux (1–0) || Astacio (0–1) || Remlinger (1) || 42,255 || 0–1
|-  style="text-align:center; background:#bfb;"
| 2 || April 4 || @ Braves || 5–3 || Tavárez (1–0) || Burkett (0–1) || Jiménez (1) || 26,132 || 1–1
|-  style="text-align:center; background:#fbb;"
| 3 || April 5 || @ Braves || 9–6 || Chen (1–0) || Aybar (0–1) || Ligtenberg (1) || 30,008 || 1–2
|-  style="text-align:center; background:#fbb;"
| 4 || April 7 || @ Marlins || 4–3 || Penny (1–0) || Yoshii (0–1) || Alfonseca (2) || 13,803 || 1–3
|-  style="text-align:center; background:#bfb;"
| 5 || April 8 || @ Marlins || 4–2 || Jiménez (1–0) || Fernandez (1–1) || Lee (1) || 20,077 || 2–3
|-  style="text-align:center; background:#fbb;"
| 6 || April 9 || @ Marlins || 7–6 || Dempster (1–1) || Astacio (0–2) || Alfonseca (3) || 16,463 || 2–4
|-  style="text-align:center; background:#bfb;"
| 7 || April 10 || Reds || 7–5 || Arrojo (1–0) || Parris (0–2) || Belinda (1) || 48,094 || 3–4
|-  style="text-align:center; background:#fbb;"
| 8 || April 11 || Reds || 10–3 || Villone (2–0) || Bohanon (0–1) || || 40,488 || 3–5
|-  style="text-align:center; background:#bfb;"
| 9 || April 12 || Reds || 7–5 || Jiménez (2–0) || Reyes (0–1) || Tavárez (1) || 38,339 || 4–5
|-  style="text-align:center; background:#bfb;"
| 10 || April 13 || Cardinals || 12–6 || Croushore (1–0) || Kile (2–1) || || 39,365 || 5–5
|-  style="text-align:center; background:#bfb;"
| 11 || April 14 || Cardinals || 6–2 || Astacio (1–2) || Ankiel (1–1) || || 40,248 || 6–5
|-  style="text-align:center; background:#fbb;"
| 12 || April 16 || Cardinals || 9–3 || Hentgen (3–0) || Arrojo (1–1) || || 43,029 || 6–6
|-  style="text-align:center; background:#bfb;"
| 13 || April 16 || Cardinals || 14–13 || Jiménez (3–0) || Mohler (0–1) || White (1) || 35,095 || 7–6
|-  style="text-align:center; background:#bfb;"
| 14 || April 17 || @ Diamondbacks || 9–1 || Yoshii (1–1) || Daal (0–1) || || 33,743 || 8–6
|-  style="text-align:center; background:#fbb;"
| 15 || April 18 || @ Diamondbacks || 7–1 || Reynoso (1–2) || Karl (0–1) || || 30,275 || 8–7
|-  style="text-align:center; background:#fbb;"
| 16 || April 19 || @ Diamondbacks || 8–7 || Morgan (1–0) || Tavárez (1–1) || Kim (1) || 31,237 || 8–8
|-  style="text-align:center; background:#fbb;"
| 17 || April 20 || @ Diamondbacks || 3–0 || Johnson (4–0) || Arrojo (1–2) || || 34,458 || 8–9
|-  style="text-align:center; background:#bfb;"
| 18 || April 21 || @ Cardinals || 6–4 || Jarvis (1–0) || Hentgen (3–1) || Jiménez (2) || 34,966 || 9–9
|-  style="text-align:center; background:#bfb;"
| 19 || April 22 || @ Cardinals || 7–6 || Croushore (2–0) || James (0–1) || Jiménez (3) || 42,901 || 10–9
|-  style="text-align:center; background:#fbb;"
| 20 || April 23 || @ Cardinals || 6–3 (7) || Benes (2–1) || Karl (0–2) || Slocumb (1) || 30,253 || 10–10
|-  style="text-align:center; background:#fbb;"
| 21 || April 25 || @ Expos || 10–4 || Pavano (3–0) || Bohanon (0–2) || || 10,019 || 10–11
|-  style="text-align:center; background:#fbb;"
| 22 || April 26 || @ Expos || 9–2 || Hermanson (3–1) || Jarvis (1–1) || Urbina (6) || 10,735 || 10–12
|-  style="text-align:center; background:#bfb;"
| 23 || April 28 || Mets || 12–5 || Astacio (2–2) || Hampton (2–4) || || 45,366 || 11–12
|-  style="text-align:center; background:#fbb;"
| 24 || April 29 || Mets || 13–6 || Reed (3–0) || Yoshii (1–2) || || 41,220 || 11–13
|-  style="text-align:center; background:#fbb;"
| 25 || April 30 || Mets || 14–11 || Leiter (2–0) || Bohanon (0–3) || || 36,252 || 11–14
|-

|-  style="text-align:center; background:#bfb;"
| 26 || May 1 || Expos || 15–8 || White (1–0) || Hermanson (3–2) || || 35,104 || 12–14
|-  style="text-align:center; background:#bfb;"
| 27 || May 2 || Expos || 12–6 || Karl (1–2) || Powell (0–2) || || 39,132 || 13–14
|-  style="text-align:center; background:#bfb;"
| 28 || May 3 || Expos || 16–7 || Astacio (3–2) || Irabu (1–3) || || 40,096 || 14–14
|-  style="text-align:center; background:#fbb;"
| 29 || May 5 || @ Giants || 5–0 || Nathan (2–0) || Yoshii (1–3) || || 40,930 || 14–15
|-  style="text-align:center; background:#fbb;"
| 30 || May 6 || @ Giants || 6–0 || Estes (2–1) || Arrojo (1–3) || || 40,930 || 14–16
|-  style="text-align:center; background:#bfb;"
| 31 || May 8 || @ Astros || 3–1 || Astacio (4–2) || Holt (1–5) || || 33,195 || 15–16
|-  style="text-align:center; background:#fbb;"
| 32 || May 9 || @ Astros || 13–8 || Pérez (2–1) || Tavárez (1–2) || || 32,130 || 15–17
|-  style="text-align:center; background:#fbb;"
| 33 || May 10 || @ Astros || 5–1 || Reynolds (5–0) || Yoshii (1–4) || || 34,265 || 15–18
|-  style="text-align:center; background:#bfb;"
| 34 || May 12 || Giants || 15–7 || Bohanon (1–3) || Nathan (2–1) || || 42,566 || 16–18
|-  style="text-align:center; background:#bfb;"
| 35 || May 13 || Giants || 10–9 || White (2–0) || Johnstone (2–3) || Jiménez (4) || 44,829 || 17–18
|-  style="text-align:center; background:#bfb;"
| 36 || May 14 || Giants || 11–7 || White (3–0) || Hernández (2–5) || || 44,577 || 18–18
|-  style="text-align:center; background:#bfb;"
| 37 || May 16 || @ Mets || 4–3 (11) || Tavárez (2–2) || Wendell (2–2) || Jiménez (5) || 25,697 || 19–18
|-  style="text-align:center; background:#fbb;"
| 38 || May 17 || @ Mets || 4–2 || Leiter (5–0) || Arrojo (1–4) || Franco (2) || 23,665 || 19–19
|-  style="text-align:center; background:#bfb;"
| 39 || May 19 || @ Phillies || 10–2 || Astacio (5–2) || Ashby (2–4) || || 14,202 || 20–19
|-  style="text-align:center; background:#bfb;"
| 40 || May 20 || @ Phillies || 4–3 || Tavárez (3–2) || Brock (0–4) || Jiménez (6) || 19,192 || 21–19
|-  style="text-align:center; background:#fbb;"
| 41 || May 21 || @ Phillies || 4–3 || Person (4–2) || Yoshii (1–5) || Brantley (2) || 20,612 || 21–20
|-  style="text-align:center; background:#bfb;"
| 42 || May 23 || Cubs || 10–7 || Bohanon (2–3) || Garibay (0–1) || || 41,264 || 22–20
|-  style="text-align:center; background:#bfb;"
| 43 || May 24 || Cubs || 9–4 || Astacio (6–2) || Farnsworth (1–5) || Jiménez (7) || 40,046 || 23–20
|-  style="text-align:center; background:#fbb;"
| 44 || May 25 || Cubs || 6–5 || Lieber (5–3) || DeJean (0–1) || Aguilera (7) || 43,178 || 23–21
|-  style="text-align:center; background:#fbb;"
| 45 || May 26 || Pirates || 2–1 || Córdova (2–4) || Yoshii (1–6) || Williams (7) || 40,188 || 23–22
|-  style="text-align:center; background:#bfb;"
| 46 || May 27 || Pirates || 7–6 || White (4–0) || Christiansen (1–3) || || 42,184 || 24–22
|-  style="text-align:center; background:#bfb;"
| 47 || May 28 || Pirates || 11–2 || Arrojo (2–4) || Anderson (1–3) || || 41,641 || 25–22
|-  style="text-align:center; background:#bfb;"
| 48 || May 29 || Astros || 8–7 || White (5–0) || Cabrera (0–1) || Jiménez (8) || 41,231 || 26–22
|-  style="text-align:center; background:#bfb;"
| 49 || May 30 || Astros || 10–7 || Belinda (1–0) || Valdes (1–1) || Jiménez (9) || 38,032 || 27–22
|-  style="text-align:center; background:#bfb;"
| 50 || May 31 || Astros || 8–6 || White (6–0) || Slusarski (0–3) || Jiménez (10) || 39,241 || 28–22
|-

|-  style="text-align:center; background:#bfb;"
| 51 || June 2 || @ Brewers || 8–6 || Arrojo (3–4) || Bere (3–4) || Myers (1) || 14,110 || 29–22
|-  style="text-align:center; background:#fbb;"
| 52 || June 3 || @ Brewers || 2–1 (12) || De Los Santos (1–2) || Belinda (1–1) || || 20,730 || 29–23
|-  style="text-align:center; background:#bfb;"
| 53 || June 4 || @ Brewers || 7–1 || Jarvis (2–1) || Haynes (6–4) || || 17,147 || 30–23
|-  style="text-align:center; background:#fbb;"
| 54 || June 5 || @ Mariners || 6–2 || Sele (6–2) || Yoshii (1–7) || || 25,582 || 30–24
|-  style="text-align:center; background:#fbb;"
| 55 || June 6 || @ Mariners || 4–1 || Tomko (4–2) || Bohanon (2–4) || Sasaki (9) || 26,812 || 30–25
|-  style="text-align:center; background:#bfb;"
| 56 || June 7 || @ Mariners || 6–1 || Arrojo (4–4) || Moyer (3–2) || || 27,050 || 31–25
|-  style="text-align:center; background:#bfb;"
| 57 || June 9 || Rangers || 3–2 (12) || Tavárez (4–2) || Wetteland (3–2) || || 44,764e || 32–25
|-  style="text-align:center; background:#bfb;"
| 58 || June 10 || Rangers || 12–6 || Karl (2–2) || Loaiza (3–4) || || 46,155 || 33–25
|-  style="text-align:center; background:#bfb;"
| 59 || June 11 || Rangers || 9–8 || DeJean (1–1) || Crabtree (1–2) || Jiménez (11) || 42,802 || 34–25
|-  style="text-align:center; background:#fbb;"
| 60 || June 13 || Astros || 6–3 || Reynolds (6–3) || Arrojo (4–5) || Wagner (6) || 42,699 || 34–26
|-  style="text-align:center; background:#fbb;"
| 61 || June 14 || Astros || 8–4 || Slusarski (1–3) || Astacio (6–3) || || 42,010 || 34–27
|-  style="text-align:center; background:#bfb;"
| 62 || June 15 || Astros || 5–4 || Jiménez (4–0) || Wagner (2–4) || || 40,743 || 35–27
|-  style="text-align:center; background:#bfb;"
| 63 || June 17 || Diamondbacks || 14–5 || Bohanon (3–4) || Anderson (6–2) || || 48,043 || 36–27
|-  style="text-align:center; background:#bfb;"
| 64 || June 18 || Diamondbacks || 19–2 || Yoshii (2–7) || Reynoso (4–6) || || 48,117 || 37–27
|-  style="text-align:center; background:#fbb;"
| 65 || June 20 || @ Reds || 3–2 || Graves (9–1) || Astacio (6–4) || || 24,060 || 37–28
|-  style="text-align:center; background:#bfb;"
| 66 || June 21 || @ Reds || 6–4 || Tavárez (5–2) || Williamson (2–4) || Jiménez (12) || 23,580 || 38–28
|-  style="text-align:center; background:#fbb;"
| 67 || June 22 || @ Reds || 5–3 || Parris (3–10) || Jarvis (2–2) || Graves (10) || 28,531 || 38–29
|-  style="text-align:center; background:#fbb;"
| 68 || June 23 || @ Diamondbacks || 2–0 || Anderson (7–2) || Bohanon (3–5) || Kim (10) || 37,089 || 38–30
|-  style="text-align:center; background:#bfb;"
| 69 || June 24 || @ Diamondbacks || 4–0 || Yoshii (3–7) || Johnson (11–2) || || 42,559 || 39–30
|-  style="text-align:center; background:#fbb;"
| 70 || June 25 || @ Diamondbacks || 8–3 || Morgan (3–1) || Astacio (6–5) || || 35,887 || 39–31
|-  style="text-align:center; background:#bfb;"
| 71 || June 26 || Giants || 15–6 || Arrojo (5–5) || Gardner (4–4) || || 40,197 || 40–31
|-  style="text-align:center; background:#fbb;"
| 72 || June 27 || Giants || 12–7 || Estes (7–3) || Jarvis (2–3) || || 41,573 || 40–32
|-  style="text-align:center; background:#bfb;"
| 73 || June 28 || Giants ||  17–13 || DeJean (2–1) || Johnstone (2–4) || || 43,405 || 41–32
|-  style="text-align:center; background:#bfb;"
| 74 || June 29 || Giants || 11–4 || Yoshii (4–7) || Nathan (4–2) || || 43,946 || 42–32
|-  style="text-align:center; background:#bfb;"
| 75 || June 30 || @ Padres || 5–4 || Astacio (7–5) || Almanzar (1–3) || Jiménez (13) || 34,811 || 43–32
|-

|-  style="text-align:center; background:#fbb;"
| 76 || July 1 || @ Padres || 5–3 || Meadows (7–5) || Arrojo (5–6) || Hoffman (21) || 34,941 || 43–33
|-  style="text-align:center; background:#bfb;"
| 77 || July 2 || @ Padres || 3–2 (10) || DeJean (3–1) || Hoffman (1–3) || Jiménez (14) || 22,873 || 44–33
|-  style="text-align:center; background:#bfb;"
| 78 || July 3 || @ Padres || 3–1 || Bohanon (4–5) || Montgomery (0–2) || Jiménez (15) || 31,717 || 45–33
|-  style="text-align:center; background:#fbb;"
| 79 || July 4 || @ Giants || 4–1 || Hernández (7–6) || Yoshii (4–8) || Nen (14) || 40,930 || 45–34
|-  style="text-align:center; background:#fbb;"
| 80 || July 4 || @ Giants || 3–0 || Gardner (5–4) || Karl (2–3) || Nen (15) || 40,930 || 45–35
|-  style="text-align:center; background:#fbb;"
| 81 || July 5 || @ Giants || 4–2 || Nathan (5–2) || Belinda (1–2) || Rodríguez (2) || 40,930 || 45–36
|-  style="text-align:center; background:#fbb;"
| 82 || July 6 || @ Giants || 6–5 || Nen (3–3) || Myers (0–1) || || 40,930 || 45–37
|-  style="text-align:center; background:#fbb;"
| 83 || July 7 || @ Angels || 12–4 || Ortiz (3–2) || Jarvis (2–4) || || 29,826 || 45–38
|-  style="text-align:center; background:#fbb;"
| 84 || July 8 || @ Angels || 6–2 || Hill (5–5) || Bohanon (4–6) || || 22,958 || 45–39
|-  style="text-align:center; background:#fbb;"
| 85 || July 9 || @ Angels || 10–4 || Bottenfield (5–7) || Yoshii (4–9) || || 23,820 || 45–40
|-  style="text-align:center; background:#fbb;"
| 86 || July 13 || Reds || 15–6 || Dessens (2–0) || Astacio (7–6) || || 48,735 || 45–41
|-  style="text-align:center; background:#fbb;"
| 87 || July 14 || Reds || 9–2 || Harnisch (2–5) || Arrojo (5–7) || || 48,471 || 45–42
|-  style="text-align:center; background:#fbb;"
| 88 || July 15 || Reds || 7–4 || Williamson (3–6) || Yoshii (4–10) || Graves (15) || 48,201 || 45–43
|-  style="text-align:center; background:#fbb;"
| 89 || July 17 || Athletics || 11–10 || Magnante (1–1) || White (6–1) || Isringhausen (20) || 40,120 || 45–44
|-  style="text-align:center; background:#bfb;"
| 90 || July 17 || Athletics || 10–9 (10) || DeJean (4–1) || Isringhausen (4–3) || || 40,276 || 46–44
|-  style="text-align:center; background:#bfb;"
| 91 || July 18 || Athletics || 18–3 || Astacio (8–6) || Mulder (5–6) || || 38,371 || 47–44
|-  style="text-align:center; background:#fbb;"
| 92 || July 19 || @ Dodgers || 9–1 || Brown (9–3) || Arrojo (5–8) || || 26,889 || 47–45
|-  style="text-align:center; background:#fbb;"
| 93 || July 20 || @ Dodgers || 6–3 || Park (10–7) || Yoshii (4–11) || Fetters (4) || 33,619 || 47–46
|-  style="text-align:center; background:#fbb;"
| 94 || July 21 || Padres || 5–1 || Eaton (2–1) || Bohanon (4–7) || || 41,118 || 47–47
|-  style="text-align:center; background:#bfb;"
| 95 || July 22 || Padres || 9–4 || White (7–1) || Clement (9–9) || || 46,085 || 48–47
|-  style="text-align:center; background:#fbb;"
| 96 || July 23 || Padres || 6–4 (10) || Hoffman (3–4) || Belinda (1–3) || Wall (1) || 40,251 || 48–48
|-  style="text-align:center; background:#fbb;"
| 97 || July 24 || Dodgers || 4–1 || Brown (10–3) || Arrojo (5–9) || Fetters (5) || 39,425 || 48–49
|-  style="text-align:center; background:#fbb;"
| 98 || July 25 || Dodgers || 6–4 || Park (11–7) || Chouinard (0–1) || Shaw (15) || 41,220 || 48–50
|-  style="text-align:center; background:#bfb;"
| 99 || July 26 || Dodgers || 11–4 || Bohanon (5–7) || Pérez (4–5) || || 40,301 || 49–50
|-  style="text-align:center; background:#fbb;"
| 100 || July 27 || Dodgers || 16–11 || Masaoka (1–0) || Carrara (0–1) || || 40,724 || 49–51
|-  style="text-align:center; background:#fbb;"
| 101 || July 28 || @ Brewers || 5–0 || Wright (6–4) || Astacio (8–7) || || 21,239 || 49–52
|-  style="text-align:center; background:#bfb;"
| 102 || July 29 || @ Brewers || 10–2 || Tavárez (6–2) || Rigdon (1–2) || || 21,762 || 50–52
|-  style="text-align:center; background:#fbb;"
| 103 || July 30 || @ Brewers || 3–2 || D'Amico (7–4) || Yoshii (4–12) || Leskanic (2) || 21,071 || 50–53
|-  style="text-align:center; background:#fbb;"
| 104 || July 31 || @ Cubs || 2–0 || Tapani (7–8) || Bohanon (5–8) || Aguilera (24) || 38,731 || 50–54
|-

|-  style="text-align:center; background:#bfb;"
| 105 || August 1 || @ Cubs || 2–1 || Astacio (9–7) || Farnsworth (1–6) || White (2) || 38,221 || 51–54
|-  style="text-align:center; background:#fbb;"
| 106 || August 2 || @ Cubs || 3–2 || Rain (3–0) || Wasdin (1–4) || Aguilera (25) || 39,539 || 51–55
|-  style="text-align:center; background:#bfb;"
| 107 || August 4 || Phillies || 8–1 || Tavárez (7–2) || Bottenfield (7–9) || || 42,827 || 52–55
|-  style="text-align:center; background:#bfb;"
| 108 || August 5 || Phillies || 7–6 || Jiménez (5–0) || Brantley (1–6) || || 40,979 || 53–55
|-  style="text-align:center; background:#fbb;"
| 109 || August 6 || Phillies || 10–9 || Chen (6–1) || Astacio (9–8) || || 38,278 || 53–56
|-  style="text-align:center; background:#fbb;"
| 110 || August 7 || Pirates || 8–7 || Sauerbeck (4–1) || Jiménez (5–1) || Williams (16) || 39,691 || 53–57
|-  style="text-align:center; background:#bfb;"
| 111 || August 8 || Pirates || 6–1 || Rose (4–5) || Silva (7–6) || || 38,535 || 54–57
|-  style="text-align:center; background:#bfb;"
| 112 || August 9 || Pirates || 4–3 || White (8–1) || Williams (2–3) || || 39,328 || 55–57
|-  style="text-align:center; background:#fbb;"
| 113 || August 10 || @ Cardinals || 5–4 || Timlin (4–3) || Jiménez (5–2) || || 44,020 || 55–58
|-  style="text-align:center; background:#bfb;"
| 114 || August 11 || @ Expos || 10–3 || Bohanon (6–8) || Hermanson (8–10) || || 9,136 || 56–58
|-  style="text-align:center; background:#bfb;"
| 115 || August 12 || @ Expos || 14–2 || Yoshii (5–12) || Moore (1–2) || || 9,815 || 57–58
|-  style="text-align:center; background:#bfb;"
| 116 || August 13 || @ Expos || 5–3 || Chouinard (1–1) || Strickland (4–2) || White (3) || 10,606 || 58–58
|-  style="text-align:center; background:#bfb;"
| 117 || August 14 || @ Expos || 4–3 || House (1–0) || Strickland (4–3) || Jiménez (16) || 6,924 || 59–58
|-  style="text-align:center; background:#fbb;"
| 118 || August 15 || @ Mets || 7–5 || Cook (6–2) || House (1–1) || Benítez (30) || || 59–59
|-  style="text-align:center; background:#fbb;"
| 119 || August 15 || @ Mets || 4–3 || Jones (8–5) || Chouinard (1–2) || Benítez (31) || 29,744 || 59–60
|-  style="text-align:center; background:#bfb;"
| 120 || August 16 || @ Mets || 7–5 || Bohanon (7–8) || Rusch (8–10) || White (4) || 29,832 || 60–60
|-  style="text-align:center; background:#fbb;"
| 121 || August 17 || @ Mets || 13–2 || Wendell (5–4) || Yoshii (5–13) || || 42,697 || 60–61
|-  style="text-align:center; background:#fbb;"
| 122 || August 18 || Marlins || 9–8 || Smith (2–4) || Rose (4–6) || Alfonseca (35) || 40,205 || 60–62
|-  style="text-align:center; background:#bfb;"
| 123 || August 19 || Marlins || 10–3 || Tavárez (8–2) || Cornelius (3–6) || || 40,232 || 61–62
|-  style="text-align:center; background:#bfb;"
| 124 || August 20 || Marlins || 13–4 || Astacio (10–8) || Sánchez (8–9) || || 38,498 || 62–62
|-  style="text-align:center; background:#fbb;"
| 125 || August 21 || Braves || 7–4 || Millwood (8–8) || Bohanon (7–9) || Rocker (17) || 43,015 || 62–63
|-  style="text-align:center; background:#bfb;"
| 126 || August 22 || Braves || 7–6 (12) || Mayne (1–0) || Rocker (1–1) || || 41,707 || 63–63
|-  style="text-align:center; background:#fbb;"
| 127 || August 23 || Braves || 5–2 || Maddux (14–7) || Rose (4–7) || Remlinger (12) || 41,850 || 63–64
|-  style="text-align:center; background:#bfb;"
| 128 || August 25 || @ Pirates || 6–3 || Tavárez (9–2) || Anderson (4–7) || || 23,104 || 64–64
|-  style="text-align:center; background:#bfb;"
| 129 || August 26 || @ Pirates || 11–4 || Astacio (11–8) || Silva (8–8) || || 23,340 || 65–64
|-  style="text-align:center; background:#bfb;"
| 130 || August 27 || @ Pirates || 9–2 || Bohanon (8–9) || Serafini (1–3) || || 20,157 || 66–64
|-  style="text-align:center; background:#fbb;"
| 131 || August 28 || @ Phillies || 3–2 || Person (7–4) || Yoshii (5–14) || Brantley (21) || 14,118 || 66–65
|-  style="text-align:center; background:#bfb;"
| 132 || August 29 || @ Phillies || 2–1 || Rose (5–7) || Daal (3–16) || Jiménez (17) || 14,862 || 67–65
|-  style="text-align:center; background:#bfb;"
| 133 || August 30 || @ Phillies || 5–4 (11) || White (9–1) || Gomes (4–6) || Jiménez (18) || 14,150 || 68–65
|-

|-  style="text-align:center; background:#bfb;"
| 134 || September 1 || Brewers || 5–3 || Astacio (12–8) || Snyder (3–7) || White (5) || 38,970 || 69–65
|-  style="text-align:center; background:#fbb;"
| 135 || September 2 || Brewers || 8–3 || D'Amico (11–5) || DeJean (4–2) || || 36,139 || 69–66
|-  style="text-align:center; background:#fbb;"
| 136 || September 3 || Brewers || 6–4 (11) || Acevedo (3–5) || DeJean (4–3) || Leskanic (9) || 36,576 || 69–67
|-  style="text-align:center; background:#bfb;"
| 137 || September 4 || Cubs || 6–2 || Rose (6–7) || Lieber (12–8) || || 40,277 || 70–67
|-  style="text-align:center; background:#bfb;"
| 138 || September 5 || Cubs || 10–2 || Tavárez (10–2) || Arnold (0–2) || || 39,159 || 71–67
|-  style="text-align:center; background:#fbb;"
| 139 || September 6 || Cubs || 8–5 (11) || Van Poppel (3–4) || White (9–2) || Aguilera (29) || 37,509 || 71–68
|-  style="text-align:center; background:#bfb;"
| 140 || September 8 || Dodgers || 8–5 || Bohanon (9–9) || Brown (12–6) || || 37,647 || 72–68
|-  style="text-align:center; background:#bfb;"
| 141 || September 9 || Dodgers || 7–6 || White (10–2) || Park (15–9) || Jiménez (19) || 37,241 || 73–68
|-  style="text-align:center; background:#fbb;"
| 142 || September 10 || Dodgers || 12–1 || Dreifort (11–8) || Astacio (12–9) || Herges (1) || 36,273 || 73–69
|-  style="text-align:center; background:#fbb;"
| 143 || September 11 || @ Padres || 7–2 || Williams (10–5) || Tavárez (10–3) || || 19,404 || 73–70
|-  style="text-align:center; background:#bfb;"
| 144 || September 12 || @ Padres || 6–3 || Yoshii (6–14) || Clement (12–15) || Jiménez (20) || 15,772 || 74–70
|-  style="text-align:center; background:#bfb;"
| 145 || September 13 || @ Padres || 11–0 || Bohanon (10–9) || Eaton (5–3) || || 13,832 || 75–70
|-  style="text-align:center; background:#bfb;"
| 146 || September 14 || @ Dodgers || 5–4 || Rose (7–7) || Park (15–10) || Jiménez (21) || 24,368 || 76–70
|-  style="text-align:center; background:#fbb;"
| 147 || September 15 || @ Dodgers || 4–3 (10) || Herges (10–3) || DeJean (4–4) || || 33,009 || 76–71
|-  style="text-align:center; background:#fbb;"
| 148 || September 16 || @ Dodgers || 5–4 || Gagné (3–6) || Tavárez (10–4) || Shaw (25) || 36,464 || 76–72
|-  style="text-align:center; background:#fbb;"
| 149 || September 17 || @ Dodgers || 12–6 || Prokopec (1–0) || Yoshii (6–15) || || 36,498 || 76–73
|-  style="text-align:center; background:#fbb;"
| 150 || September 19 || Padres || 7–2 || Clement (13–15) || Bohanon (10–10) || || 36,295 || 76–74
|-  style="text-align:center; background:#fbb;"
| 151 || September 20 || Padres || 15–11 || Eaton (6–3) || Rose (7–8) || Hoffman (41) || 36,088 || 76–75
|-  style="text-align:center; background:#bfb;"
| 152 || September 21 || Padres || 13–4 || Jarvis (3–4) || Tollberg (4–4) || || 36,286 || 77–75
|-  style="text-align:center; background:#fbb;"
| 153 || September 22 || Marlins || 8–4 || Penny (7–7) || Tavárez (10–5) || || 45,529 || 77–76
|-  style="text-align:center; background:#fbb;"
| 154 || September 23 || Marlins || 3–1 (7) || Smith (5–6) || Wasdin (1–5) || || 36,355 || 77–77
|-  style="text-align:center; background:#bfb;"
| 155 || September 24 || Marlins || 9–3 || Bohanon (11–10) || Sánchez (9–12) || || 35,071 || 78–77
|-  style="text-align:center; background:#fbb;"
| 156 || September 25 || Diamondbacks || 6–4 || Johnson (19–6) || Rose (7–9) || Mantei (17) || 37,131 || 78–78
|-  style="text-align:center; background:#bfb;"
| 157 || September 26 || Diamondbacks || 7–6 || Chouinard (2–2) || Morgan (5–5) || Jiménez (22) || 35,703 || 79–78
|-  style="text-align:center; background:#bfb;"
| 158 || September 27 || Diamondbacks || 6–4 || White (11–2) || Plesac (5–1) || Jiménez (23) || 36,519 || 80–78
|-  style="text-align:center; background:#fbb;"
| 159 || September 28 || Diamondbacks || 12–3 || Reynoso (11–12) || Wasdin (1–6) || || 36,659 || 80–79
|-  style="text-align:center; background:#bfb;"
| 160 || September 29 || @ Braves || 4–2 || Bohanon (12–10) || Ashby (12–13) || Jiménez (24) || 44,548 || 81–79
|-  style="text-align:center; background:#fbb;"
| 161 || September 30 || @ Braves || 5–2 || Glavine (21–9) || Rose (7–10) || Rocker (24) || 48,933 || 81–80
|-

|-  style="text-align:center; background:#bfb;"
| 162 || October 1 || @ Braves || 10–5 || Tavárez (11–5) || Rocker (1–2) || || 45,794 || 82–80
|-

Farm system

See also

 List of Colorado Rockies team records
 List of Major League Baseball annual doubles leaders
 List of Major League Baseball annual putouts leaders
 List of Major League Baseball annual runs batted in leaders
 List of Major League Baseball batting champions
 List of National League annual slugging percentage leaders
 List of Silver Slugger Award winners at first base

References

 2000 Colorado Rockies at Baseball Reference
 2000 Colorado Rockies team page at www.baseball-almanac.com

Colorado Rockies seasons
Colorado Rockies season
Colorado Rockies
2000s in Denver